Kyiv Art School was a secondary educational institution in Kyiv between 1900 and 1920. 

It offered painting, drawing, and sketching classes. In 1901 it established a regular program of classes, with departments in architecture and painting.

Other organizers included , Volodymyr Orlovsky, Mykola Pymonenko, Khariton Platonov, and Ivan Seleznov. Faculty included , Mykhailo Boichuk, Mykhailo Kozyk, Fedir Krychevsky, and Oleksandr Murashko.

Sources 

 

1900 establishments in Ukraine
Art schools in Ukraine
Defunct schools
Education in Kyiv
Educational institutions established in 1900
Schools in Kyiv